The 2005-06 Azerbaijan Top League was the fourteenth season of the Top League since its establishment in 1992. The season began on 7 August 2005 and finished on 24 May 2006. Neftchi Baku are the defending champions, having won the previous season.

Teams

Stadia and locations
Note: Table lists in alphabetical order.

League table

Results

Season statistics

Top goalscorers

Hat-tricks
 

 4 Player scored 4 goals

References

External links
Azerbaijan 2005-06 RSSSF

Azerbaijan Premier League seasons
Azer
1